Science and Technology Museum may refer to:

Asia
 Israel National Museum of Science, Technology, and Space in Haifa, Israel
 National Science and Technology Museum in Kaohsiung, Taiwan
 China Science and Technology Museum in Beijing, China
 Shanghai Science and Technology Museum in Shanghai, China
 Sichuan Science and Technology Museum in Sichuan, China

Europe
 Museo Nazionale Scienza e Tecnologia Leonardo da Vinci in Milan, Italy
 Norwegian Museum of Science and Technology in Oslo, Norway
 Swedish National Museum of Science and Technology in Stockholm, Sweden

North America
 Canada Science and Technology Museum in Ottawa, Ontario, Canada
 Milton J. Rubenstein Museum of Science and Technology in Syracuse, New York, USA
 Science & Technology Museum of Atlanta (SciTrek) in Atlanta, Georgia, USA

South America
 Museum of Science and Technology in Rio Grande do Sul, Brazil